Alojz Ihan (born 23 July 1961) is a doctor, specialist in medical microbiology and immunology from Slovenia. Beside his medical profession he is also an acclaimed poet, writer, essayist and editor.
 
Ihan was born in Ljubljana in 1961 and studied at the Medical Faculty at the University of Ljubljana. He works at the University's Institute for Microbiology and Immunology. He is also known for his poetry and regularly publishes essays and oppinons in Slovene newspapers and journals. He received the Prešeren Foundation Award for his poetry collection Srebrnik (Silver Coin) in 1987 and in 1996 won the Jenko Award for his poetry collection Južno dekle (Southern Girl).
In 2013, he won the prestigious Rožanc Award for his book Civic Essays (Državljanski eseji). The book however received a mixed reception, with some critics denouncing its populist tone and weak arguments.

Poetry
Srebrnik (Silver Coin), 1985
Igralci pokra (Poker Players), 1989
Pesmi (Poems), 1989
Ritem (Rhythm), 1993
Južno dekle (Southern Girl), 1995
Salsa (Salsa), 2003

Novels
Hiša (House), 1997
Romanje za dva … in psa (Pilgrimage for Two ... and a Dog), 1998
Hvalnica rešnjemu telesu (Ode to the Most Holy Body), 2011
"Slike z razstave" (Pictures at an Exhibition), 2013

Collection of Essays
Platon pri zobozdravniku (Plato at the Dentist), 1997
Deset božjih zapovedi (Ten Holy Commandments), 2000
"Državljanski eseji" (Civic Essays), 2012

Popular science
Imunski sistem in odpornost : kako se ubranimo bolezni (The Immune System and Immunity : How to Avoid Falling Ill), 2000
Do odpornosti z glavo (To Immunity by Using Your Head ), 2003
Prebujanje : Psiha v iskanju izgubljenega Erosa - psihonevroimunologija, 2014

Scientific publications
Klinična uporaba analize limfocitnih populacij s pretočnim citometrom (The Clinical Use of Flow Cytometry Analysis in Lymphocyte Cultures), 1999

References

Slovenian poets
Slovenian male poets
Slovenian immunologists
Living people
1961 births
People from Ljubljana in health professions
University of Ljubljana alumni